The Scranton Times-Tribune is a morning newspaper serving the Scranton, Pennsylvania, area. It is the flagship title of Times-Shamrock Communications and has been run by three generations of the Lynett-Haggerty family. On Sundays, the paper is published as The Sunday Times. The paper has an average circulation of 47,663.

History
The current paper is the result of a 2005 merger between the afternoon Scranton Times and morning Scranton Tribune.

The Times was founded in 1870. It struggled under six owners before E. J. Lynett bought the paper in 1895. Within 20 years, the Times was the dominant newspaper in northeastern Pennsylvania, and the third-largest in the state (behind only the Philadelphia Inquirer and the Pittsburgh Press). In January 1923, Lynett founded one of Scranton's first radio stations, WQAN. The Lynett family still owns the station today under the calls WEJL.

Lynett died in 1943, and his three children took control of the paper with William R. Lynett, the oldest, as publisher. He died in 1946; siblings Edward J. and Elizabeth R. Lynett took over as co-publishers, with Edward J. as editor. Edward J. Lynett died in 1966, and his four children took over; they still run the paper today. Shortly after they took over, the Times expanded to a full week with the appearance of The Sunday Times.

In 1990, the Times bought the remains of its principal rival, the morning Scrantonian-Tribune. This paper had been founded in 1891 as the Scranton Tribune. In 1910, it merged with Scranton's first newspaper, The Morning Republican, and changed its name to the Scranton Republican. After Louis A. Watres and Laurence Hawley Watres sold the Republican in 1934, it became the Scranton Tribune once again in 1936. In 1938, Richard Little, owner of Scranton's Sunday paper, The Scrantonian (founded 1897), teamed up with Morris L. Goodman to buy the Tribune as well. The Goodman-Little family partnership continued for almost half a century, until Richard Little III sold his interest to the Goodmans in 1986. Only a year later, Media One Corporation (no relation to the cable company) bought out the Goodmans and merged the two papers into one seven-day morning paper, The Scrantonian-Tribune. However, Media One was unable to turn the paper around. In 1990, it shuttered the paper. The Lynetts bought the Scrantonian-Tribune nameplate and some other assets, and relaunched the paper as the Scranton Tribune, with much of the same content as the Times (except for timely editing).

By 2004, it was obvious that Scranton could no longer support a morning and afternoon paper, and the Lynetts announced that their two papers would merge into one morning paper, The Times-Tribune. The new paper first rolled off the presses on July 27, 2005. However, its legal name is still The Scranton Times; the licensee for sister radio station WEJL and its satellites is "The Scranton Times L. P."

Political leanings
The Scranton Times-Tribune editorial policy is generally viewed as independent, but progressive. The Times-Tribune endorsed George W. Bush in 2000 but did not endorse anyone in 2004. The Times-Tribune endorsed Barack Obama in 2008 and 2012. The paper endorsed Hillary Clinton in 2016 and Joe Biden in 2020.

Awards
The Scranton Times won the Pulitzer Prize for Public Service in 1946, while the Scranton Tribune and Scrantonian (then separately owned) won the prize for Local Reporting in 1959.

References

External links
The Times-Tribune founded in 2005

Daily newspapers published in Pennsylvania
Mass media in Scranton, Pennsylvania
Publications established in 1870
1870 establishments in Pennsylvania
Pulitzer Prize for Public Service winners
Pulitzer Prize-winning newspapers